Sir Tom John Marsters,  (born 4 August 1945) is the fifth and current King's Representative to the Cook Islands (formerly Queen's Representative). He is a former Deputy Prime Minister of the Cook Islands, Foreign Minister, and Deputy Leader of the Cook Islands Party.

Personal life

Marsters was born on Palmerston Island and educated at Nikao and Avarua Primary Schools before attending Avele Agriculture College in Samoa and Grimsby Institute of Technology in the United Kingdom. Before entering politics he worked as a public servant. He was Secretary General of the Cook Islands Party from 1968 to 1999.

He was first elected to Parliament for the seat of Murienua in a by-election in 1991.

Cabinet

Marsters served as Minister of Works in the Cabinet of Sir Geoffrey Henry, but resigned his position in 1997 in protest at budget cuts. He later served as Minister of Works, Youth, Sport and Recreation in the first coalition Cabinet of Robert Woonton from 2002 to 2003.  He rejoined Cabinet after the 2004 election, when Woonton was trying to put together a new coalition; when Woonton resigned to fight a by-election, he served in the Cabinet of Jim Marurai, holding the portfolios of foreign affairs, transport, and youth and sport.

In August 2005, Marurai sacked Cook Islands Party leader Sir Geoffrey Henry from Cabinet, causing the CIP to reconsider its role in government. A month later, Marsters was also sacked, and the coalition formally dissolved.

Opposition

The retirement of Sir Geoffrey Henry in 2006 led to a leadership election, which saw Marsters replaced as Deputy leader by Tupou Faireka. However, both Faireka and party leader Henry Puna lost their seats at the 2006 election. While Puna continued to serve as leader outside parliament, Marsters became leader of the opposition.

Deputy Prime Minister

Marsters was re-elected at the 2010 elections, which saw the Cook Islands Party win 16 of the 24 seats. Henry Puna was elected Prime Minister, and Marsters was appointed to Cabinet as Deputy Prime Minister, Minister of Foreign Affairs, and Minister of Mining and Natural Resources. As Minister of Mining and Natural Resources he promoted seabed mining, and negotiated a Regional Seabed Mining Framework through the Pacific Islands Forum. he began negotiations with the Cook Island's neighbours over marine boundaries, and sent a delegation to the United Nations in New York to negotiate an extension of the country's continental shelf boundaries under the United Nations Convention on the Law of the Sea.

Sovereign's Representative

On 5 June 2013, Marsters was appointed as the Queen's Representative, replacing Sir Frederick Goodwin. He resigned from Parliament on 25 July 2013 to take up the role, precipitating the 2013 Murienua by-election. In June 2016, he made a rare intervention as Queen's Representative, ruling that Parliament had been properly adjourned and that therefore a purported opposition vote of no-confidence ousting the government was of no effect. He was reappointed for a second three-year term in July 2016, and a third one in 2019.

In the 2018 Queen's Birthday Honours, Marsters was appointed a Knight Commander of the Order of the British Empire. His investiture took place in November 2018 in a ceremony at Buckingham Palace.

In January 2019, Marsters helped turn the first sod and lay the first stones of Marsters House, a hostel for the various branches of the Marsters family in Rarotonga. The hostel was opened in July 2019.

Following the death of Elizabeth II, Marsters formally became known as the "King's Representative".

References

External links

Profile at Cook Islands Parliament.

1945 births
Living people
Queen's Representatives in the Cook Islands
Deputy Prime Ministers of the Cook Islands
Cook Islands Party politicians
Foreign Ministers of the Cook Islands
Members of the Parliament of the Cook Islands
People from Palmerston Island
Tom
Cook Island people of British descent
Cook Island knights